Pitino is a surname. Notable people with the surname include:

Richard Pitino (born 1982), American basketball coach, son of Rick
Rick Pitino (born 1952), American basketball coach

See also
Patiño